Alechemy is a microbrewery in Livingston, West Lothian, Scotland. It was founded by James Davies in 2012. Davies has a background in chemistry and microbiology. It produces seven regular and eleven seasonal real ales.

See also
 List of microbreweries

References

External links
Official website

Beer in Scotland